The points of the compass are a set of horizontal, radially arrayed compass directions (or azimuths) used in navigation and cartography. A compass rose is primarily composed of four cardinal directions—north, east, south, and west—each separated by 90 degrees, and secondarily divided by four ordinal (intercardinal) directions—northeast, southeast, southwest, and northwest—each located halfway between two cardinal directions. Some disciplines such as meteorology and navigation further divide the compass with additional azimuths. Within European tradition, a fully defined compass has 32 'points' (and any finer subdivisions are described in fractions of points). 

Compass points are valuable in that they allow a user to refer to a specific azimuth in a colloquial fashion, without having to compute or remember degrees.

Designations

The names of the compass point directions follow these rules:

8-wind compass rose 

 The four cardinal directions are north (N), east (E), south (S), west (W), at 90° angles on the compass rose.
 The four intercardinal (or ordinal) directions are formed by bisecting the above, giving: northeast (NE), southeast (SE), southwest (SW) and northwest (NW). In English and many other tongues, these are compound words. Different style guides for the four mandate spaces, dashes, or none.
 In Bulgarian, Catalan, Czech, Danish, Dutch, English, Esperanto, French, Galician, German, Greek, Hungarian, Ido, Italian, Japanese (usually), Macedonian, Norwegian (both Bokmal and Nynorsk), Polish, Portuguese, Romansch, Russian, Serbian, Croatian, Spanish, Swedish, Ukrainian and Welsh the part meaning north or south precedes the part meaning east or west.
 In Chinese, Vietnamese, Gaelic and less commonly in Japanese, the part meaning east or west precedes the other.
 In Estonian, Finnish, the "Italianate system", and Telugu, the intercardinals have distinct words.
 The eight principal winds (or main winds) are the set union of the cardinals and intercardinals. Taken in turn, each is 45° from the next. These form the 8-wind compass rose, the rose at its usual basic level today.

16-wind compass rose 
 The eight half-winds are the direction points obtained by bisecting the angles between the principal winds. The half-winds are north-northeast (NNE), east-northeast (ENE), east-southeast (ESE), south-southeast (SSE), south-southwest (SSW), west-southwest (WSW), west-northwest (WNW) and north-northwest (NNW). The name of each half-wind is constructed by combining the names of the principal winds to either side, with the cardinal wind coming first and the intercardinal wind second.
 The eight principal winds and the eight half-winds together form the 16-wind compass rose, with each compass point at a ° angle from its two neighbours.

32-wind compass rose 

 The sixteen quarter-winds are the direction points obtained by bisecting the angles between the points on the 16-wind compass rose (above). The quarter-winds are: (in first quadrant) north by east (NbE), northeast by north (NEbN), northeast by east (NEbE), and east by north (EbN); (in second quadrant) east by south (EbS), southeast by east (SEbE), southeast by south (SEbS), and south by east (SbE); (in third quadrant) south by west (SbW), southwest by south (SWbS), southwest by west (SWbW), and west by south (WbS); (in fourth quadrant) west by north (WbN), northwest by west (NWbW), northwest by north (NWbN), and north by west (NbW).
 All of the points in the 16-wind compass rose plus the sixteen quarter-winds together form the 32-wind compass rose.
 If breaking down for study/signalling the subcomponents are called the "principal" followed by the "cardinal" wind/direction. As a mnemonic (memory device), minds familiar encode the meaning of "X by Y" as "one small measure" from X towards Y". It can be noted such measure is °. So, for example, "northeast by east" means "one quarter of the gap from NE towards E".

In summary, the 32-wind compass rose comes from the eight principal winds, eight half-winds and sixteen quarter-winds combined, with each compass point at an ° angle from the next.

In the mariner's exercise of boxing the compass, all thirty-two points of the compass are named in clockwise order.

Half- and quarter-points

By the middle of the 18th century, the 32-point system had been further extended by using half- and quarter-points to give a total of 128 directions.
These fractional points are named by appending, for example east, east, or east to the name of one of the 32 points. Each of the 96 fractional points can be named in two ways, depending on which of the two adjoining whole points is used, for example, NE is equivalent to NbEN. Either form is easily understood, but alternative conventions as to correct usage developed in different countries and organisations. "It is the custom in the United States Navy to box from north and south toward east and west, with the exception that divisions adjacent to a cardinal or inter-cardinal point are always referred to that point." The Royal Navy used the additional "rule that quarter points were never read from a point beginning and ending with the same letter."

Compass roses very rarely named the fractional points and only showed small, unlabelled markers as a guide for helmsmen.

128 compass directions
The table below shows how each of the 128 directions are named. The first two columns give the number of points and degrees clockwise from north. The third gives the equivalent bearing to the nearest degree from north or south towards east or west. The "CW" column gives the fractional-point bearings increasing in the clockwise direction and "CCW" counterclockwise. The final three columns show three common naming conventions: No "by" avoids the use of "by" with fractional points. Colour coding shows whether each of the three naming systems matches the "CW" or "CCW" column.

{| class="wikitable collapsible collapsed" style="text-align:center;"
|-
! Points !! Degrees !! Bearing !! CW !! CCW !! No "by" !!  (USN) !!  (RN)
|-
| 0 || 0° 0′ 0″ || N || colspan=5|N
|-
|  || 2° 48′ 45″ || N 3° E || bgcolor="#E0C0C0"|NE || bgcolor="#C0C0E0"|NbEN || bgcolor="#E0C0C0"|NE || bgcolor="#E0C0C0"|NE || bgcolor="#E0C0C0"|NE
|-
|  || 5° 37′ 30″ || N 6° E || bgcolor="#E0C0C0"|NE || bgcolor="#C0C0E0"|NbEN || bgcolor="#E0C0C0"|NE || bgcolor="#E0C0C0"|NE || bgcolor="#E0C0C0"|NE
|-
|  || 8° 26′ 15″ || N 8° E || bgcolor="#E0C0C0"|NE || bgcolor="#C0C0E0"|NbEN || bgcolor="#E0C0C0"|NE || bgcolor="#E0C0C0"|NE || bgcolor="#E0C0C0"|NE
|-
| 1 || 11° 15′ 0″ || N 11° E || colspan=5|NbE
|-
|  || 14° 3′ 45″ || N 14° E || bgcolor="#E0C0C0"|NbEE || bgcolor="#C0C0E0"|NNEN || bgcolor="#C0C0E0"|NNEN || bgcolor="#E0C0C0"|NbEE || bgcolor="#E0C0C0"|NbEE
|-
|  || 16° 52′ 30″ || N 17° E || bgcolor="#E0C0C0"|NbEE || bgcolor="#C0C0E0"|NNEN || bgcolor="#C0C0E0"|NNEN || bgcolor="#E0C0C0"|NbEE || bgcolor="#E0C0C0"|NbEE
|-
|  || 19° 41′ 15″ || N 20° E || bgcolor="#E0C0C0"|NbEE || bgcolor="#C0C0E0"|NNEN || bgcolor="#C0C0E0"|NNEN || bgcolor="#E0C0C0"|NbEE || bgcolor="#E0C0C0"|NbEE
|-
| 2 || 22° 30′ 0″ || N 23° E || colspan=5|NNE
|-
|  || 25° 18′ 45″ || N 25° E || bgcolor="#E0C0C0"|NNEE || bgcolor="#C0C0E0"|NEbNN || bgcolor="#E0C0C0"|NNEE || bgcolor="#E0C0C0"|NNEE || bgcolor="#E0C0C0"|NNEE
|-
|  || 28° 7′ 30″ || N 28° E || bgcolor="#E0C0C0"|NNEE || bgcolor="#C0C0E0"|NEbNN || bgcolor="#E0C0C0"|NNEE || bgcolor="#E0C0C0"|NNEE || bgcolor="#E0C0C0"|NNEE
|-
|  || 30° 56′ 15″ || N 31° E || bgcolor="#E0C0C0"|NNEE || bgcolor="#C0C0E0"|NEbNN || bgcolor="#E0C0C0"|NNEE || bgcolor="#E0C0C0"|NNEE || bgcolor="#E0C0C0"|NNEE
|-
| 3 || 33° 45′ 0″ || N 34° E || colspan=5|NEbN
|-
|  || 36° 33′ 45″ || N 37° E || bgcolor="#E0C0C0"|NEbNE || bgcolor="#C0C0E0"|NEN || bgcolor="#C0C0E0"|NEN || bgcolor="#C0C0E0"|NEN || bgcolor="#C0C0E0"|NEN
|-
|  || 39° 22′ 30″ || N 39° E || bgcolor="#E0C0C0"|NEbNE || bgcolor="#C0C0E0"|NEN || bgcolor="#C0C0E0"|NEN || bgcolor="#C0C0E0"|NEN || bgcolor="#C0C0E0"|NEN
|-
|  || 42° 11′ 15″ || N 42° E || bgcolor="#E0C0C0"|NEbNE || bgcolor="#C0C0E0"|NEN || bgcolor="#C0C0E0"|NEN || bgcolor="#C0C0E0"|NEN || bgcolor="#C0C0E0"|NEN
|-
| 4 || 45° 0′ 0″ || N 45° E || colspan=5|NE
|-
|  || 47° 48′ 45″ || N 48° E || bgcolor="#E0C0C0"|NEE || bgcolor="#C0C0E0"|NEbEN || bgcolor="#E0C0C0"|NEE || bgcolor="#E0C0C0"|NEE || bgcolor="#E0C0C0"|NEE
|-
|  || 50° 37′ 30″ || N 51° E || bgcolor="#E0C0C0"|NEE || bgcolor="#C0C0E0"|NEbEN || bgcolor="#E0C0C0"|NEE || bgcolor="#E0C0C0"|NEE || bgcolor="#E0C0C0"|NEE
|-
|  || 53° 26′ 15″ || N 53° E || bgcolor="#E0C0C0"|NEE || bgcolor="#C0C0E0"|NEbEN || bgcolor="#E0C0C0"|NEE || bgcolor="#E0C0C0"|NEE || bgcolor="#E0C0C0"|NEE
|-
| 5 || 56° 15′ 0″ || N 56° E || colspan=5|NEbE
|-
|  || 59° 3′ 45″ || N 59° E || bgcolor="#E0C0C0"|NEbEE || bgcolor="#C0C0E0"|ENEN || bgcolor="#C0C0E0"|ENEN || bgcolor="#E0C0C0"|NEbEE || bgcolor="#E0C0C0"|NEbEE
|-
|  || 61° 52′ 30″ || N 62° E || bgcolor="#E0C0C0"|NEbEE || bgcolor="#C0C0E0"|ENEN || bgcolor="#C0C0E0"|ENEN || bgcolor="#E0C0C0"|NEbEE || bgcolor="#E0C0C0"|NEbEE
|-
|  || 64° 41′ 15″ || N 65° E || bgcolor="#E0C0C0"|NEbEE || bgcolor="#C0C0E0"|ENEN || bgcolor="#C0C0E0"|ENEN || bgcolor="#E0C0C0"|NEbEE || bgcolor="#E0C0C0"|NEbEE
|-
| 6 || 67° 30′ 0″ || N 68° E || colspan=5|ENE
|-
|  || 70° 18′ 45″ || N 70° E || bgcolor="#E0C0C0"|ENEE || bgcolor="#C0C0E0"|EbNN || bgcolor="#E0C0C0"|ENEE || bgcolor="#E0C0C0"|ENEE || bgcolor="#C0C0E0"|EbNN
|-
|  || 73° 7′ 30″ || N 73° E || bgcolor="#E0C0C0"|ENEE || bgcolor="#C0C0E0"|EbNN || bgcolor="#E0C0C0"|ENEE || bgcolor="#E0C0C0"|ENEE || bgcolor="#C0C0E0"|EbNN
|-
|  || 75° 56′ 15″ || N 76° E || bgcolor="#E0C0C0"|ENEE || bgcolor="#C0C0E0"|EbNN || bgcolor="#E0C0C0"|ENEE || bgcolor="#E0C0C0"|ENEE || bgcolor="#C0C0E0"|EbNN
|-
| 7 || 78° 45′ 0″ || N 79° E || colspan=5|EbN
|-
|  || 81° 33′ 45″ || N 82° E || bgcolor="#E0C0C0"|EbNE || bgcolor="#C0C0E0"|EN || bgcolor="#C0C0E0"|EN || bgcolor="#C0C0E0"|EN || bgcolor="#C0C0E0"|EN
|-
|  || 84° 22′ 30″ || N 84° E || bgcolor="#E0C0C0"|EbNE || bgcolor="#C0C0E0"|EN || bgcolor="#C0C0E0"|EN || bgcolor="#C0C0E0"|EN || bgcolor="#C0C0E0"|EN
|-
|  || 87° 11′ 15″ || N 87° E || bgcolor="#E0C0C0"|EbNE || bgcolor="#C0C0E0"|EN || bgcolor="#C0C0E0"|EN || bgcolor="#C0C0E0"|EN || bgcolor="#C0C0E0"|EN
|-
| 8 || 90° 0′ 0″ || E || colspan=5|E
|-
|  || 92° 48′ 45″ || S 87° E || bgcolor="#E0C0C0"|ES || bgcolor="#C0C0E0"|EbSE || bgcolor="#E0C0C0"|ES || bgcolor="#E0C0C0"|ES || bgcolor="#E0C0C0"|ES
|-
|  || 95° 37′ 30″ || S 84° E || bgcolor="#E0C0C0"|ES || bgcolor="#C0C0E0"|EbSE || bgcolor="#E0C0C0"|ES || bgcolor="#E0C0C0"|ES || bgcolor="#E0C0C0"|ES
|-
|  || 98° 26′ 15″ || S 82° E || bgcolor="#E0C0C0"|ES || bgcolor="#C0C0E0"|EbSE || bgcolor="#E0C0C0"|ES || bgcolor="#E0C0C0"|ES || bgcolor="#E0C0C0"|ES
|-
| 9 || 101° 15′ 0″ || S 79° E || colspan=5|EbS
|-
|  || 104° 3′ 45″ || S 76° E || bgcolor="#E0C0C0"|EbSS || bgcolor="#C0C0E0"|ESEE || bgcolor="#C0C0E0"|ESEE || bgcolor="#C0C0E0"|ESEE || bgcolor="#E0C0C0"|EbSS
|-
|  || 106° 52′ 30″ || S 73° E || bgcolor="#E0C0C0"|EbSS || bgcolor="#C0C0E0"|ESEE || bgcolor="#C0C0E0"|ESEE || bgcolor="#C0C0E0"|ESEE || bgcolor="#E0C0C0"|EbSS
|-
|  || 109° 41′ 15″ || S 70° E || bgcolor="#E0C0C0"|EbSS || bgcolor="#C0C0E0"|ESEE || bgcolor="#C0C0E0"|ESEE || bgcolor="#C0C0E0"|ESEE || bgcolor="#E0C0C0"|EbSS
|-
| 10 || 112° 30′ 0″ || S 68° E || colspan=5|ESE
|-
|  || 115° 18′ 45″ || S 65° E || bgcolor="#E0C0C0"|ESES || bgcolor="#C0C0E0"|SEbEE || bgcolor="#E0C0C0"|ESES || bgcolor="#C0C0E0"|SEbEE || bgcolor="#C0C0E0"|SEbEE
|-
|  || 118° 7′ 30″ || S 62° E || bgcolor="#E0C0C0"|ESES || bgcolor="#C0C0E0"|SEbEE || bgcolor="#E0C0C0"|ESES || bgcolor="#C0C0E0"|SEbEE || bgcolor="#C0C0E0"|SEbEE
|-
|  || 120° 56′ 15″ || S 59° E || bgcolor="#E0C0C0"|ESES || bgcolor="#C0C0E0"|SEbEE || bgcolor="#E0C0C0"|ESES || bgcolor="#C0C0E0"|SEbEE || bgcolor="#C0C0E0"|SEbEE
|-
| 11 || 123° 45′ 0″ || S 56° E || colspan=5|SEbE
|-
|  || 126° 33′ 45″ || S 53° E || bgcolor="#E0C0C0"|SEbES || bgcolor="#C0C0E0"|SEE || bgcolor="#C0C0E0"|SEE || bgcolor="#C0C0E0"|SEE || bgcolor="#C0C0E0"|SEE
|-
|  || 129° 22′ 30″ || S 51° E || bgcolor="#E0C0C0"|SEbES || bgcolor="#C0C0E0"|SEE || bgcolor="#C0C0E0"|SEE || bgcolor="#C0C0E0"|SEE || bgcolor="#C0C0E0"|SEE
|-
|  || 132° 11′ 15″ || S 48° E || bgcolor="#E0C0C0"|SEbES || bgcolor="#C0C0E0"|SEE || bgcolor="#C0C0E0"|SEE || bgcolor="#C0C0E0"|SEE || bgcolor="#C0C0E0"|SEE
|-
| 12 || 135° 0′ 0″ || S 45° E || colspan=5|SE
|-
|  || 137° 48′ 45″ || S 42° E || bgcolor="#E0C0C0"|SES || bgcolor="#C0C0E0"|SEbSE || bgcolor="#E0C0C0"|SES || bgcolor="#E0C0C0"|SES || bgcolor="#E0C0C0"|SES
|-
|  || 140° 37′ 30″ || S 39° E || bgcolor="#E0C0C0"|SES || bgcolor="#C0C0E0"|SEbSE || bgcolor="#E0C0C0"|SES || bgcolor="#E0C0C0"|SES || bgcolor="#E0C0C0"|SES
|-
|  || 143° 26′ 15″ || S 37° E || bgcolor="#E0C0C0"|SES || bgcolor="#C0C0E0"|SEbSE || bgcolor="#E0C0C0"|SES || bgcolor="#E0C0C0"|SES || bgcolor="#E0C0C0"|SES
|-
| 13 || 146° 15′ 0″ || S 34° E || colspan=5|SEbS
|-
|  || 149° 3′ 45″ || S 31° E || bgcolor="#E0C0C0"|SEbSS || bgcolor="#C0C0E0"|SSEE || bgcolor="#C0C0E0"|SSEE || bgcolor="#C0C0E0"|SSEE || bgcolor="#C0C0E0"|SSEE
|-
|  || 151° 52′ 30″ || S 28° E || bgcolor="#E0C0C0"|SEbSS || bgcolor="#C0C0E0"|SSEE || bgcolor="#C0C0E0"|SSEE || bgcolor="#C0C0E0"|SSEE || bgcolor="#C0C0E0"|SSEE
|-
|  || 154° 41′ 15″ || S 25° E || bgcolor="#E0C0C0"|SEbSS || bgcolor="#C0C0E0"|SSEE || bgcolor="#C0C0E0"|SSEE || bgcolor="#C0C0E0"|SSEE || bgcolor="#C0C0E0"|SSEE
|-
| 14 || 157° 30′ 0″ || S 23° E || colspan=5|SSE
|-
|  || 160° 18′ 45″ || S 20° E || bgcolor="#E0C0C0"|SSES || bgcolor="#C0C0E0"|SbEE || bgcolor="#E0C0C0"|SSES || bgcolor="#C0C0E0"|SbEE || bgcolor="#C0C0E0"|SbEE
|-
|  || 163° 7′ 30″ || S 17° E || bgcolor="#E0C0C0"|SSES || bgcolor="#C0C0E0"|SbEE || bgcolor="#E0C0C0"|SSES || bgcolor="#C0C0E0"|SbEE || bgcolor="#C0C0E0"|SbEE
|-
|  || 165° 56′ 15″ || S 14° E || bgcolor="#E0C0C0"|SSES || bgcolor="#C0C0E0"|SbEE || bgcolor="#E0C0C0"|SSES || bgcolor="#C0C0E0"|SbEE || bgcolor="#C0C0E0"|SbEE
|-
| 15 || 168° 45′ 0″ || S 11° E || colspan=5|SbE
|-
|  || 171° 33′ 45″ || S 8° E || bgcolor="#E0C0C0"|SbES || bgcolor="#C0C0E0"|SE || bgcolor="#C0C0E0"|SE || bgcolor="#C0C0E0"|SE || bgcolor="#C0C0E0"|SE
|-
|  || 174° 22′ 30″ || S 6° E || bgcolor="#E0C0C0"|SbES || bgcolor="#C0C0E0"|SE || bgcolor="#C0C0E0"|SE || bgcolor="#C0C0E0"|SE || bgcolor="#C0C0E0"|SE
|-
|  || 177° 11′ 15″ || S 3° E || bgcolor="#E0C0C0"|SbES || bgcolor="#C0C0E0"|SE || bgcolor="#C0C0E0"|SE || bgcolor="#C0C0E0"|SE || bgcolor="#C0C0E0"|SE
|-
| 16 || 180° 0′ 0″ || S || colspan=5|S
|-
|  || 182° 48′ 45″ || S 3° W || bgcolor="#E0C0C0"|SW || bgcolor="#C0C0E0"|SbWS || bgcolor="#E0C0C0"|SW || bgcolor="#E0C0C0"|SW || bgcolor="#E0C0C0"|SW
|-
|  || 185° 37′ 30″ || S 6° W || bgcolor="#E0C0C0"|SW || bgcolor="#C0C0E0"|SbWS || bgcolor="#E0C0C0"|SW || bgcolor="#E0C0C0"|SW || bgcolor="#E0C0C0"|SW
|-
|  || 188° 26′ 15″ || S 8° W || bgcolor="#E0C0C0"|SW || bgcolor="#C0C0E0"|SbWS || bgcolor="#E0C0C0"|SW || bgcolor="#E0C0C0"|SW || bgcolor="#E0C0C0"|SW
|-
| 17 || 191° 15′ 0″ || S 11° W || colspan=5|SbW
|-
|  || 194° 3′ 45″ || S 14° W || bgcolor="#E0C0C0"|SbWW || bgcolor="#C0C0E0"|SSWS || bgcolor="#C0C0E0"|SSWS || bgcolor="#E0C0C0"|SbWW || bgcolor="#E0C0C0"|SbWW
|-
|  || 196° 52′ 30″ || S 17° W || bgcolor="#E0C0C0"|SbWW || bgcolor="#C0C0E0"|SSWS || bgcolor="#C0C0E0"|SSWS || bgcolor="#E0C0C0"|SbWW || bgcolor="#E0C0C0"|SbWW
|-
|  || 199° 41′ 15″ || S 20° W || bgcolor="#E0C0C0"|SbWW || bgcolor="#C0C0E0"|SSWS || bgcolor="#C0C0E0"|SSWS || bgcolor="#E0C0C0"|SbWW || bgcolor="#E0C0C0"|SbWW
|-
| 18 || 202° 30′ 0″ || S 23° W || colspan=5|SSW
|-
|  || 205° 18′ 45″ || S 25° W || bgcolor="#E0C0C0"|SSWW || bgcolor="#C0C0E0"|SWbSS || bgcolor="#E0C0C0"|SSWW || bgcolor="#E0C0C0"|SSWW || bgcolor="#E0C0C0"|SSWW
|-
|  || 208° 7′ 30″ || S 28° W || bgcolor="#E0C0C0"|SSWW || bgcolor="#C0C0E0"|SWbSS || bgcolor="#E0C0C0"|SSWW || bgcolor="#E0C0C0"|SSWW || bgcolor="#E0C0C0"|SSWW
|-
|  || 210° 56′ 15″ || S 31° W || bgcolor="#E0C0C0"|SSWW || bgcolor="#C0C0E0"|SWbSS || bgcolor="#E0C0C0"|SSWW || bgcolor="#E0C0C0"|SSWW || bgcolor="#E0C0C0"|SSWW
|-
| 19 || 213° 45′ 0″ || S 34° W || colspan=5|SWbS
|-
|  || 216° 33′ 45″ || S 37° W || bgcolor="#E0C0C0"|SWbSW || bgcolor="#C0C0E0"|SWS || bgcolor="#C0C0E0"|SWS || bgcolor="#C0C0E0"|SWS || bgcolor="#C0C0E0"|SWS
|-
|  || 219° 22′ 30″ || S 39° W || bgcolor="#E0C0C0"|SWbSW || bgcolor="#C0C0E0"|SWS || bgcolor="#C0C0E0"|SWS || bgcolor="#C0C0E0"|SWS || bgcolor="#C0C0E0"|SWS
|-
|  || 222° 11′ 15″ || S 42° W || bgcolor="#E0C0C0"|SWbSW || bgcolor="#C0C0E0"|SWS || bgcolor="#C0C0E0"|SWS || bgcolor="#C0C0E0"|SWS || bgcolor="#C0C0E0"|SWS
|-
| 20 || 225° 0′ 0″ || S 45° W || colspan=5|SW
|-
|  || 227° 48′ 45″ || S 48° W || bgcolor="#E0C0C0"|SWW || bgcolor="#C0C0E0"|SWbWS || bgcolor="#E0C0C0"|SWW || bgcolor="#E0C0C0"|SWW || bgcolor="#E0C0C0"|SWW
|-
|  || 230° 37′ 30″ || S 51° W || bgcolor="#E0C0C0"|SWW || bgcolor="#C0C0E0"|SWbWS || bgcolor="#E0C0C0"|SWW || bgcolor="#E0C0C0"|SWW || bgcolor="#E0C0C0"|SWW
|-
|  || 233° 26′ 15″ || S 53° W || bgcolor="#E0C0C0"|SWW || bgcolor="#C0C0E0"|SWbWS || bgcolor="#E0C0C0"|SWW || bgcolor="#E0C0C0"|SWW || bgcolor="#E0C0C0"|SWW
|-
| 21 || 236° 15′ 0″ || S 56° W || colspan=5|SWbW
|-
|  || 239° 3′ 45″ || S 59° W || bgcolor="#E0C0C0"|SWbWW || bgcolor="#C0C0E0"|WSWS || bgcolor="#C0C0E0"|WSWS || bgcolor="#E0C0C0"|SWbWW || bgcolor="#E0C0C0"|SWbWW
|-
|  || 241° 52′ 30″ || S 62° W || bgcolor="#E0C0C0"|SWbWW || bgcolor="#C0C0E0"|WSWS || bgcolor="#C0C0E0"|WSWS || bgcolor="#E0C0C0"|SWbWW || bgcolor="#E0C0C0"|SWbWW
|-
|  || 244° 41′ 15″ || S 65° W || bgcolor="#E0C0C0"|SWbWW || bgcolor="#C0C0E0"|WSWS || bgcolor="#C0C0E0"|WSWS || bgcolor="#E0C0C0"|SWbWW || bgcolor="#E0C0C0"|SWbWW
|-
| 22 || 247° 30′ 0″ || S 68° W || colspan=5|WSW
|-
|  || 250° 18′ 45″ || S 70° W || bgcolor="#E0C0C0"|WSWW || bgcolor="#C0C0E0"|WbSS || bgcolor="#E0C0C0"|WSWW || bgcolor="#E0C0C0"|WSWW || bgcolor="#C0C0E0"|WbSS
|-
|  || 253° 7′ 30″ || S 73° W || bgcolor="#E0C0C0"|WSWW || bgcolor="#C0C0E0"|WbSS || bgcolor="#E0C0C0"|WSWW || bgcolor="#E0C0C0"|WSWW || bgcolor="#C0C0E0"|WbSS
|-
|  || 255° 56′ 15″ || S 76° W || bgcolor="#E0C0C0"|WSWW || bgcolor="#C0C0E0"|WbSS || bgcolor="#E0C0C0"|WSWW || bgcolor="#E0C0C0"|WSWW || bgcolor="#C0C0E0"|WbSS
|-
| 23 || 258° 45′ 0″ || S 79° W || colspan=5|WbS
|-
|  || 261° 33′ 45″ || S 82° W || bgcolor="#E0C0C0"|WbSW || bgcolor="#C0C0E0"|WS || bgcolor="#C0C0E0"|WS || bgcolor="#C0C0E0"|WS || bgcolor="#C0C0E0"|WS
|-
|  || 264° 22′ 30″ || S 84° W || bgcolor="#E0C0C0"|WbSW || bgcolor="#C0C0E0"|WS || bgcolor="#C0C0E0"|WS || bgcolor="#C0C0E0"|WS || bgcolor="#C0C0E0"|WS
|-
|  || 267° 11′ 15″ || S 87° W || bgcolor="#E0C0C0"|WbSW || bgcolor="#C0C0E0"|WS || bgcolor="#C0C0E0"|WS || bgcolor="#C0C0E0"|WS || bgcolor="#C0C0E0"|WS
|-
| 24 || 270° 0′ 0″ || W || colspan=5|W
|-
|  || 272° 48′ 45″ || N 87° W || bgcolor="#E0C0C0"|WN || bgcolor="#C0C0E0"|WbNW || bgcolor="#E0C0C0"|WN || bgcolor="#E0C0C0"|WN || bgcolor="#E0C0C0"|WN
|-
|  || 275° 37′ 30″ || N 84° W || bgcolor="#E0C0C0"|WN || bgcolor="#C0C0E0"|WbNW || bgcolor="#E0C0C0"|WN || bgcolor="#E0C0C0"|WN || bgcolor="#E0C0C0"|WN
|-
|  || 278° 26′ 15″ || N 82° W || bgcolor="#E0C0C0"|WN || bgcolor="#C0C0E0"|WbNW || bgcolor="#E0C0C0"|WN || bgcolor="#E0C0C0"|WN || bgcolor="#E0C0C0"|WN
|-
| 25 || 281° 15′ 0″ || N 79° W || colspan=5|WbN
|-
|  || 284° 3′ 45″ || N 76° W || bgcolor="#E0C0C0"|WbNN || bgcolor="#C0C0E0"|WNWW || bgcolor="#C0C0E0"|WNWW || bgcolor="#C0C0E0"|WNWW || bgcolor="#E0C0C0"|WbNN
|-
|  || 286° 52′ 30″ || N 73° W || bgcolor="#E0C0C0"|WbNN || bgcolor="#C0C0E0"|WNWW || bgcolor="#C0C0E0"|WNWW || bgcolor="#C0C0E0"|WNWW || bgcolor="#E0C0C0"|WbNN
|-
|  || 289° 41′ 15″ || N 70° W || bgcolor="#E0C0C0"|WbNN || bgcolor="#C0C0E0"|WNWW || bgcolor="#C0C0E0"|WNWW || bgcolor="#C0C0E0"|WNWW || bgcolor="#E0C0C0"|WbNN
|-
| 26 || 292° 30′ 0″ || N 68° W || colspan=5|WNW
|-
|  || 295° 18′ 45″ || N 65° W || bgcolor="#E0C0C0"|WNWN || bgcolor="#C0C0E0"|NWbWW || bgcolor="#E0C0C0"|WNWN || bgcolor="#C0C0E0"|NWbWW || bgcolor="#C0C0E0"|NWbWW
|-
|  || 298° 7′ 30″ || N 62° W || bgcolor="#E0C0C0"|WNWN || bgcolor="#C0C0E0"|NWbWW || bgcolor="#E0C0C0"|WNWN || bgcolor="#C0C0E0"|NWbWW || bgcolor="#C0C0E0"|NWbWW
|-
|  || 300° 56′ 15″ || N 59° W || bgcolor="#E0C0C0"|WNWN || bgcolor="#C0C0E0"|NWbWW || bgcolor="#E0C0C0"|WNWN || bgcolor="#C0C0E0"|NWbWW || bgcolor="#C0C0E0"|NWbWW
|-
| 27 || 303° 45′ 0″ || N 56° W || colspan=5|NWbW
|-
|  || 306° 33′ 45″ || N 53° W || bgcolor="#E0C0C0"|NWbWN || bgcolor="#C0C0E0"|NWW || bgcolor="#C0C0E0"|NWW || bgcolor="#C0C0E0"|NWW || bgcolor="#C0C0E0"|NWW
|-
|  || 309° 22′ 30″ || N 51° W || bgcolor="#E0C0C0"|NWbWN || bgcolor="#C0C0E0"|NWW || bgcolor="#C0C0E0"|NWW || bgcolor="#C0C0E0"|NWW || bgcolor="#C0C0E0"|NWW
|-
|  || 312° 11′ 15″ || N 48° W || bgcolor="#E0C0C0"|NWbWN || bgcolor="#C0C0E0"|NWW || bgcolor="#C0C0E0"|NWW || bgcolor="#C0C0E0"|NWW || bgcolor="#C0C0E0"|NWW
|-
| 28 || 315° 0′ 0″ || N 45° W || colspan=5|NW
|-
|  || 317° 48′ 45″ || N 42° W || bgcolor="#E0C0C0"|NWN || bgcolor="#C0C0E0"|NWbNW || bgcolor="#E0C0C0"|NWN || bgcolor="#E0C0C0"|NWN || bgcolor="#E0C0C0"|NWN
|-
|  || 320° 37′ 30″ || N 39° W || bgcolor="#E0C0C0"|NWN || bgcolor="#C0C0E0"|NWbNW || bgcolor="#E0C0C0"|NWN || bgcolor="#E0C0C0"|NWN || bgcolor="#E0C0C0"|NWN
|-
|  || 323° 26′ 15″ || N 37° W || bgcolor="#E0C0C0"|NWN || bgcolor="#C0C0E0"|NWbNW || bgcolor="#E0C0C0"|NWN || bgcolor="#E0C0C0"|NWN || bgcolor="#E0C0C0"|NWN
|-
| 29 || 326° 15′ 0″ || N 34° W || colspan=5|NWbN
|-
|  || 329° 3′ 45″ || N 31° W || bgcolor="#E0C0C0"|NWbNN || bgcolor="#C0C0E0"|NNWW || bgcolor="#C0C0E0"|NNWW || bgcolor="#C0C0E0"|NNWW || bgcolor="#C0C0E0"|NNWW
|-
|  || 331° 52′ 30″ || N 28° W || bgcolor="#E0C0C0"|NWbNN || bgcolor="#C0C0E0"|NNWW || bgcolor="#C0C0E0"|NNWW || bgcolor="#C0C0E0"|NNWW || bgcolor="#C0C0E0"|NNWW
|-
|  || 334° 41′ 15″ || N 25° W || bgcolor="#E0C0C0"|NWbNN || bgcolor="#C0C0E0"|NNWW || bgcolor="#C0C0E0"|NNWW || bgcolor="#C0C0E0"|NNWW || bgcolor="#C0C0E0"|NNWW
|-
| 30 || 337° 30′ 0″ || N 23° W || colspan=5|NNW
|-
|  || 340° 18′ 45″ || N 20° W || bgcolor="#E0C0C0"|NNWN || bgcolor="#C0C0E0"|NbWW || bgcolor="#E0C0C0"|NNWN || bgcolor="#C0C0E0"|NbWW || bgcolor="#C0C0E0"|NbWW
|-
|  || 343° 7′ 30″ || N 17° W || bgcolor="#E0C0C0"|NNWN || bgcolor="#C0C0E0"|NbWW || bgcolor="#E0C0C0"|NNWN || bgcolor="#C0C0E0"|NbWW || bgcolor="#C0C0E0"|NbWW
|-
|  || 345° 56′ 15″ || N 14° W || bgcolor="#E0C0C0"|NNWN || bgcolor="#C0C0E0"|NbWW || bgcolor="#E0C0C0"|NNWN || bgcolor="#C0C0E0"|NbWW || bgcolor="#C0C0E0"|NbWW
|-
| 31 || 348° 45′ 0″ || N 11° W || colspan=5|NbW
|-
|  || 351° 33′ 45″ || N 8° W || bgcolor="#E0C0C0"|NbWN || bgcolor="#C0C0E0"|NW || bgcolor="#C0C0E0"|NW || bgcolor="#C0C0E0"|NW || bgcolor="#C0C0E0"|NW
|-
|  || 354° 22′ 30″ || N 6° W || bgcolor="#E0C0C0"|NbWN || bgcolor="#C0C0E0"|NW || bgcolor="#C0C0E0"|NW || bgcolor="#C0C0E0"|NW || bgcolor="#C0C0E0"|NW
|-
|  || 357° 11′ 15″ || N 3° W || bgcolor="#E0C0C0"|NbWN || bgcolor="#C0C0E0"|NW || bgcolor="#C0C0E0"|NW || bgcolor="#C0C0E0"|NW || bgcolor="#C0C0E0"|NW
|-
| 32 || 360° 0′ 0″ || N || colspan=5|N
|}

Traditional Mediterranean compass points 
The traditional compass rose of eight winds (and its 16-wind and 32-wind derivatives) was invented by seafarers in the Mediterranean Sea during the Middle Ages (with no obvious connection to the twelve classical compass winds of the ancient Greeks and Romans). The traditional mariner's wind names were expressed in Italian, or more precisely, the Italianate  Mediterranean lingua franca common among sailors in the 13th and 14th centuries, which was principally composed of Genoese (Ligurian), mixed with Venetian, Sicilian, Provençal, Catalan, Greek and Arabic terms from around the Mediterranean basin.

This Italianate patois was used to designate the names of the principal winds on the compass rose found in mariners' compasses and portolan charts of the 14th and 15th centuries. The "traditional" names of the eight principal winds are:
 (N) – Tramontana
 (NE) – Greco  (or Bora in some Venetian sources)
 (E) – Levante (sometimes Oriente)
 (SE) – Scirocco (or Exaloc in Catalan)
 (S) – Ostro (or  Mezzogiorno in Venetian)
 (SW) – Libeccio (or Garbino, Eissalot in Provençal)
 (W) – Ponente (or Zephyrus in Greek)
 (NW) – Maestro (or Mistral in Provençal)

Local spelling variations are far more numerous than listed, e.g. Tramutana, Gregale, Grecho, Sirocco, Xaloc, Lebeg, Libezo, Leveche, Mezzodi, Migjorn, Magistro, Mestre, etc. Traditional compass roses will typically have the initials T, G, L, S, O, L, P, and M on the main points. Portolan charts also colour-coded the compass winds: black for the eight principal winds, green for the eight half-winds, and red for the sixteen quarter-winds.

Each half-wind name is simply a combination of the two principal winds that it bisects, with the shortest name usually placed first, for example: NNE is "Greco-Tramontana"; ENE is "Greco-Levante"; SSE is "Ostro-Scirocco", etc. The quarter winds are expressed with an Italian phrase, "Quarto di X verso Y" ( one quarter from X towards Y),  or "X al Y" (X to Y) or "X per Y" (X by Y). There are no irregularities to trip over; the closest principal wind always comes first, the more distant one second, for example: north-by-east is "Quarto di Tramontana verso Greco"; and northeast-by-north is "Quarto di Greco verso Tramontana".

The table below shows how the 32 compass points are named. Each point has an angular range of  degrees where the azimuth midpoint is the horizontal angular direction (clockwise from north) of the given compass bearing; minimum is the lower (counterclockwise) angular limit of the compass point; and maximum is the upper (clockwise) angular limit of the compass point.

{| class="wikitable collapsible collapsed" style="text-align:center;"
! rowspan=2 | No.
! rowspan=2 | Compass point
! rowspan=2 | Abbreviation
! rowspan=2 | Traditional wind point
! colspan=3 | Azimuth
|-
! Minimum
! Midpoint
! Maximum
|-
! 0
| align="left" |North
| N
| Tramontana
| align="right" |°
| align="right" |0°
| align="right" |°
|-
! 1
| align="left" |North by east
| NbE
| Quarto di Tramontana verso Greco
| align="right" |°
| align="right" |°
| align="right" |°
|-
! 2
| align="left" |North-northeast
| NNE
| Greco-Tramontana
| align="right" |°
| align="right" |°
| align="right" |°
|-
! 3
| align="left" |Northeast by north
| NEbN
| Quarto di Greco verso Tramontana
| align="right" |°
| align="right" |°
| align="right" |°
|-
! 4
| align="left" |Northeast
| NE
| Greco
| align="right" |°
| align="right" |45°
| align="right" |°
|-
! 5
| align="left" |Northeast by east
| NEbE
| Quarto di Greco verso Levante
| align="right" |°
| align="right" |°
| align="right" |°
|-
! 6
| align="left" |East-northeast
| ENE
| Greco-Levante
| align="right" |°
| align="right" |°
| align="right" |°
|-
! 7
| align="left" |East by north
| EbN
| Quarto di Levante verso Greco
| align="right" |°
| align="right" |°
| align="right" |°
|-
! 8
| align="left" |East
| E
| Levante
| align="right" |°
| align="right" |90°
| align="right" |°
|-
! 9
| align="left" |East by south
| EbS
| Quarto di Levante verso Scirocco
| align="right" |°
| align="right" |°
| align="right" |°
|-
! 10
| align="left" |East-southeast
| ESE
| Levante-Scirocco
| align="right" |°
| align="right" |°
| align="right" |°
|-
! 11
| align="left" |Southeast by east
| SEbE
| Quarto di Scirocco verso Levante
| align="right" |°
| align="right" |°
| align="right" |°
|-
! 12
| align="left" |Southeast
| SE
| Scirocco
| align="right" |°
| align="right" |135°
| align="right" |°
|-
! 13
| align="left" |Southeast by south
| SEbS
| Quarto di Scirocco verso Ostro
| align="right" |°
| align="right" |°
| align="right" |°
|-
! 14
| align="left" |South-southeast
| SSE
| Ostro-Scirocco
| align="right" |°
| align="right" |°
| align="right" |°
|-
! 15
| align="left" |South by east
| SbE
| Quarto di Ostro verso Scirocco
| align="right" |°
| align="right" |°
| align="right" |°
|-
! 16
| align="left" |South
| S
| Ostro
| align="right" |°
| align="right" |180°
| align="right" |°
|-
! 17
| align="left" |South by west
| SbW
| Quarto di Ostro verso Libeccio
| align="right" |°
| align="right" |°
| align="right" |°
|-
! 18
| align="left" |South-southwest
| SSW
| Ostro-Libeccio
| align="right" |°
| align="right" |°
| align="right" |°
|-
! 19
| align="left" |Southwest by south
| SWbS
| Quarto di Libeccio verso Ostro
| align="right" |°
| align="right" |°
| align="right" |°
|-
! 20
| align="left" |Southwest
| SW
| Libeccio
| align="right" |°
| align="right" |225°
| align="right" |°
|-
! 21
| align="left" |Southwest by west
| SWbW
| Quarto di Libeccio verso Ponente
| align="right" |°
| align="right" |°
| align="right" |°
|-
! 22
| align="left" |West-southwest
| WSW
| Ponente-Libeccio
| align="right" |°
| align="right" |°
| align="right" |°
|-
! 23
| align="left" |West by south
| WbS
| Quarto di Ponente verso Libeccio
| align="right" |°
| align="right" |°
| align="right" |°
|-
! 24
| align="left" |West
| W
| Ponente
| align="right" |°
| align="right" |270°
| align="right" |°
|-
! 25
| align="left" |West by north
| WbN
| Quarto di Ponente verso Maestro
| align="right" |°
| align="right" |°
| align="right" |°
|-
! 26
| align="left" |West-northwest
| WNW
| Maestro-Ponente
| align="right" |°
| align="right" |°
| align="right" |°
|-
! 27
| align="left" |Northwest by west
| NWbW
| Quarto di Maestro verso Ponente
| align="right" |°
| align="right" |°
| align="right" |°
|-
! 28
| align="left" |Northwest
| NW
| Maestro
| align="right" |°
| align="right" |315°
| align="right" |°
|-
! 29
| align="left" |Northwest by north
| NWbN
| Quarto di Maestro verso Tramontana
| align="right" |°
| align="right" |°
| align="right" |°
|-
! 30
| align="left" |North-northwest
| NNW
| Maestro-Tramontana
| align="right" |°
| align="right" |°
| align="right" |°
|-
! 31
| align="left" |North by west
| NbW
| Quarto di Tramontana verso Maestro
| align="right" |°
| align="right" |°
| align="right" |°
|-
! 32
| align="left" |North
| N
| Tramontana
| align="right" |°
| align="right" |360°
| align="right" |°
|}

Chinese compass points
Navigation texts dating from the Yuan, Ming, and Qing dynasties in China use a 24-pointed compass with named directions. These are based on the twelve Earthly Branches, which also form the basis of the Chinese zodiac.

Headings mid-way in-between are compounds as in English. For instance,  refers to the direction halfway between point  and point , or °. This technique is referred to as a double-needle compass.

See also
 Bearing (navigation)
 Course (navigation)
 Heading (navigation)
 TVMDC
 Wind rose

References

External links

 Wind Rose (archived) – discusses the origins of the names for compass directions.

Navigational equipment
Orientation (geometry)
Units of angle